Pajtim Statovci (born 1990) is a Finnish novelist. His debut novel, Kissani Jugoslavia, was published in 2014, winning the Helsingin Sanomat Literature Prize for best debut novel in Finnish for that year, and was published in 2017 as My Cat Yugoslavia in the UK and US. It was made into a play and staged at the Finnish National Theater in Helsinki in 2018. His second novel, Tiranan sydän, won the Toisinkoinen Literature Prize for 2016, and was published as Crossing in the UK and the US in 2019.

Early life 
Statovci was born in Kosovo in 1990 to Albanian parents. In 1992, after the outbreak of war in Yugoslavia, of which Kosovo was a part and where Albanians were persecuted, his family fled to Finland. He studied comparative literature at the University of Helsinki and screenwriting at Aalto University School of Arts, Design and Architecture.

Awards 
2019: Finlandia Award winner for his third novel, Bolla 

2019: Finalist for the National Book Award for Translated Literature for Crossing (translated by David Hackston)

2019: Longlisted for the International Dublin Literary Award 

2018: Helsinki Writer of the Year Award 

2017: Shortlisted for the Future of Finnish Culture Award

2016: Toisinkoinen Literature Prize

2015: Shortlisted for the Flame Bearer Prize

2014: Shortlisted for the Young Aleksis Literature Prize

2014: Helsingin Sanomat Literature Prize (Best Debut)

Bibliography

Novels 

 Kissani Jugoslavia, Otava, 2014 (My Cat Yugoslavia, Pantheon Books, 2017; trans. David Hackston).  (Finnish);  (English).
 Tiranan Sydän, Otava, 2016 (Crossing, Pantheon Books, 2019 ; trans. David Hackston).  (Finnish);  (English).
 Bolla Otava, 2019 (Bolla, Pantheon Books, 2021; trans. David Hackston). .
———————
Notes

References 

1990 births
21st-century Finnish novelists
Magic realism writers
Aalto University alumni
Finnish people of Kosovan descent
Kosovan emigrants to Finland
Living people
University of Helsinki alumni
Writers from Helsinki